The Soothsayer is the seventh album by Wayne Shorter, recorded in 1965, but not released on Blue Note until 1979. The album features five originals by Shorter and an arrangement of Jean Sibelius' "Valse Triste". The featured musicians are trumpeter Freddie Hubbard, alto saxophonist James Spaulding, pianist McCoy Tyner, bassist Ron Carter and drummer  Tony Williams.

Reception
The Allmusic review by Stacia Proefrock awarded the album 4½ stars stating "it ranks with the best of his works from this incredibly fertile period".

Track listing 
All compositions by Wayne Shorter except where noted.

 "Lost" – 7:20
 "Angola" – 4:56
 "The Big Push" – 8:23
 "The Soothsayer" – 9:40
 "Lady Day" – 5:36
 "Valse Triste" (Jean Sibelius) – 7:45
 "Angola" [Alternate Take] – 6:41

Personnel 
Wayne Shorter – tenor saxophone
Freddie Hubbard – trumpet
James Spaulding – alto saxophone
McCoy Tyner – piano
Ron Carter – bass
Tony Williams – drums

References 

Wayne Shorter albums
1979 albums
Blue Note Records albums
Albums produced by Alfred Lion
Albums recorded at Van Gelder Studio